The Stomatogastric Nervous System (STNS) is a commonly studied neural network composed of several ganglia in arthropods that controls the motion of the gut and foregut. The network of neurons acts as a central pattern generator. It is a model system for motor pattern generation because of the small number of cells, which are comparatively large and can be reliably identified.  The system is composed of the stomatogastric ganglion (STG), oesophageal ganglion and the paired commissural ganglia.

Because of the many similarities between vertebrate and invertebrate systems, especially with regards to basic principles of neuronal function, invertebrate model systems such as the crustacean stomatogastric nervous system continue to provide key insight into how neural circuits operate in the numerically larger and less accessible vertebrate CNS.

Understanding how neuronal networks enable animals and humans to make coordinated movements is a continuing goal of neuroscience research. The stomatogastric nervous system of decapod crustaceans, which controls aspects of feeding, has contributed significantly to the general principles guiding our present understanding of how rhythmic motor circuits operate at the cellular level.

Rhythmic behaviors include all motor acts that at their core involve a rhythmic repeating set of movements. The circuits underlying such rhythmic behaviors, central pattern generators (CPGs), all operate on the same general principles. These networks remain rhythmic in the completely isolated nervous system, even in the absence of all rhythmic neuronal input, including feedback from sensory systems. Although the details differ in each circuit, all CPGs use the same set of cellular-level mechanisms for circuit construction. More importantly, CPG circuits are usually not dedicated to producing a single neuronal activity pattern. This flexibility results largely from the ability of different neuromodulators to change the cellular and synaptic properties of individual circuit neurons. When the properties of circuit components are changed, the output of the circuit itself is modified. These aspects of CPG operation are often shared by other circuits, enabling a general understanding of neuronal circuit operation.

The STNS contains a set of distinct but interacting motor circuits. The understanding of this multifunctional network contributed importantly to the general understanding of neural circuit operation. The value of this system has resulted from its accessibility, the use of several innovative techniques, and the combined research effort of around 15 laboratories over the past ~30 years.

External links
 A Scholarpedia article on the stomatogastric ganglion
 Overview and links
 Journal of Visualized Experiments: Cancer borealis stomatogastric nervous system dissection video article
 List of Laboratories currently working on the stomatogastric nervous system

Animal nervous system
Arthropod anatomy